The fourth season of the Brazilian version of the reality television show De Férias com o Ex, premiered on MTV on Thursday, April 25, 2019. The season concluded on 11 July 2019 after twelve episodes. The season was filmed in Ilhabela, São Paulo, and was the first season filmed outside the Nordeste.

Cast

Cast duration 

 Key:  = "Cast member" is featured in this episode
 Key:  = "Cast member" arrives on the beach
 Key:  = "Cast member" has an ex arrive on the beach
 Key:  = "Cast member" has two exes arrive on the beach
 Key:  = "Cast member" arrives on the beach and has an ex arrive during the same episode
 Key:  = "Cast member" leaves the beach
 Key:  = "Cast member" has an ex arrive on the beach and leaves during the same episode
 Key:  = "Cast member" arrives on the beach and leaves during the same episode
 Key:  = "Cast member" does not feature in this episode

Future Appearances 

Bifão and Tati Dias, appeared in A Fazenda 11, Tati finished in 13th, and Bifão finished in 11th.

Stéfani Bays appeared in the follow season, De Férias com o Ex Brasil: Celebs as original cast member. Stéfani also appeared in A Fazenda 12, she finished in 3rd place in the competition.

Laryssa Bottino appeared in De Férias com o Ex: Celebs 2 as original cast member. In 2021, Lary also appeared in A Fazenda 13, she finished in 16th place in the competition.

References

External links
Official website 

De Férias com o Ex seasons
2019 Brazilian television seasons
Ex on the Beach